Ashot IV (died c. 1040–41), surnamed Kaj, i.e. "the Brave, the Valiant", was the younger son of King Gagik I of Armenia.

Life
When his eldest brother Hovhannes-Smbat  (known also as Smbat III) was enthroned as King of Armenia as the legal heir of the Bagratuni Dynasty as King of Armenia (King of Ani), Ashot was greatly displeased as he had aspirations to the throne. So he organized a military campaign through his supporters besieging and later conquering the Armenian capital Ani, usurping the power and dethroning the king Hovhannes-Smbat in 1021.

But later on a compromise agreement was reached between the two feuding brothers such the legal heir would reassume his power but on a much smaller territory in provinces near the capital, whereas Ashot would become king in provinces closer to Persia and Georgia. The simultaneous rule of the two brothers continued with Hovhannes-Smbat ruling (1020–1040) and that of Ashot IV (1021–1039).

However despite the compromise agreement, the feud, sometimes military, continued between the two brothers during their concurrent reign thus greatly weakening the unity of the Bagratuni dynasty.

Their troublesome rule was followed by Gagik II, the last king of the dynasty from 1042-1045 when the dynasty finally  collapsed.
Ashot IV may actually be Ashot VIII lineage, but was the fourth Ashot to hold the Armenian  throne, the previous king Ashots being Ashot I of Armenia, (known as Ashot the Carnivorous) who ruled 884-890, Ashot II (known as Ashot Yerkat' (Ashot the Iron), 915-930, Ashot III Voghormats, (Ashot the Gracious) 953-977.

His son, Gagik II, would later assume the throne and become the last king of Bagratuni lineage to hold the crown of the Armenian kingdom.

Bagratuni dynasty
11th-century monarchs in Asia
Kings of Bagratid Armenia
11th-century Armenian people